←2008 - 2009 - 2010→

This is a list of Japanese television dramas (often called doramas by fans) broadcast in 2009.

2009 winter season
Series

Specials
 Nene (寧々)- starring Yukie Nakama, Kamejiro Ichikawa
 Fukuie Keibuho no Aisatsu (福家警部補の挨拶)- starring Hiromi Nagasaku, Kotaro Koizumi
 Akuma no Temari Uta (悪魔の手毬唄)- starring Goro Inagaki, Yūta Hiraoka, Yu Yamada
 Anmitsu Hime 2 (あんみつ姫2)- starring Mao Inoue, Nagasawa Masami
 Soka, Mo Kimi wa Inai no Ka (そうか、もう君はいないのか)- starring Tamura Masakazu Tamura, Junko Fuji, Masami Nagasawa
 Daremo Mamorenai (誰も守れない)- starring Kōichi Satō, Mirai Shida, Ryuhei Matsuda
 Code Blue SP (コード・ブルー)- starring Tomohisa Yamashita, Yui Aragaki, Erika Toda
 Zettai Kareshi SP  (絶対彼氏) - starring Mokomichi Hayami, Hiro Mizushima, Saki Aibu
 Keikan no Chi (警官の血)- starring Yōsuke Eguchi, Hidetaka Yoshioka, Hideaki Itō
 Shirasu Jiro (白洲次郎)- starring Yusuke Iseya, Miki Nakatani, Eiji Okuda

2009 spring season
Series

Specials
 Ekiro (駅路) - starring Kōji Yakusho, Eri Fukatsu
 Kamiji Yusuke Monogatari (上地雄輔物語) - starring Yuki Yoshuda, Yusuke Kamiji
 Kurobe no Taiyo (黒部の太陽) - starring Shingo Katori, Kaoru Koyabashi, Haruka Ayase
 Gokusen 3 SP (ごくせん) - starring Yukie Nakama, Ken Kaneko, Yuko Nakazawa, Ken Utsui

2009 summer season
Series

Specials
 Shibatora SP (シバトラ) - starring Teppei Koike, Suzuka Ohgo, Miki Maya, Naohito Fujiki

2009 autumn season
Series

See also
 List of Japanese television dramas
2009 in Japanese television

 List of Japanese Television Dramas
Dramas, 2009